Crisis is a live album by the American jazz saxophonist and composer Ornette Coleman recorded at New York University in 1969 and released on the Impulse! label.

In 2017, Real Gone Music reissued Crisis on CD as part of a compilation that also included Ornette at 12.

Reception
Brian Olewnick's AllMusic review awarded the album 4½ stars and stated: "Crisis somehow lacks the reputation of the revolutionary Coleman albums from early in his career, but on purely musical grounds it ranks among his most satisfying works".

Track listing
All compositions by Ornette Coleman except as indicated
 "Broken Shadows" – 5:59
 "Comme Il Faut" – 14:26
 "Song for Ché" (Charlie Haden) – 11:32
 "Space Jungle" – 5:20
 "Trouble in the East" – 6:39
Recorded at New York University in New York City on March 22, 1969.

Personnel
Ornette Coleman – alto saxophone, trumpet, violin
Don Cherry – cornet, Indian flute
Dewey Redman – tenor saxophone, clarinet
Charlie Haden – bass
Denardo Coleman – drums

References

1972 live albums
Ornette Coleman live albums
Impulse! Records live albums